Ashburn is a surname.  In England, men living near an important, named waterway might be named after it, as in the case of Ashburn originating from "ash tree brook".  An alternative English origin states that Ashburn is a variant of Ashborn, which itself descended from several surnames in use during the 14th and 15th centuries.

Notable people who share this surname include:
Cliff Ashburn (1905–1989), American football player
George W. Ashburn (1814–1868), American radical republican murdered by Ku Klux Klan
Ida Nancy Ashburn (1909–1980), Australian headmistress and nurse
Justin Ashburn (born 1981), American race car driver
Kristen Ashburn (born 1973, American photojournalist
Percy Moreau Ashburn (1872–1940), American medical officer
Richie Ashburn (1927–1997), American baseball player
Roy Ashburn (born 1954), American politician
Thomas Q. Ashburn (1820–1890), American judge
Thomas Q. Ashburn (general) (1874–1941), American army officer

See also
 Ashburn (disambiguation)

References